is a private women's college in Ukyō, Kyoto, Kyoto, Japan. The predecessor of the school was founded in 1939. It was chartered as a women's junior college in 1949 and became a four-year college in 1964.

External links
 Official website

Educational institutions established in 1939
Private universities and colleges in Japan
Universities and colleges in Kyoto Prefecture
1939 establishments in Japan